Ledong Li Autonomous County (postal: Loktung) is an autonomous county in Hainan province, China. It is one of six autonomous counties of Hainan. Its postal code is 572500, and in 1999 its population was 468,834 people, largely made up of the Li people.

Climate

See also
 List of administrative divisions of Hainan
 Liguo, a town in Ledong

References

 
 Official website (Chinese)

Ledong Li Autonomous County
Li autonomous counties